Andrej Danko (born 12 August 1974) is a Slovak  politician who has been Speaker of the National Council of the Slovak Republic from 2016 to 2020 and Chairman of the Slovak National Party since 2012.

Biography
Born in Revúca, Danko studied at the Faculty of Law at Comenius University in Bratislava. After compulsory military service, he founded several commercial companies and worked as an independent lawyer.

During 2006–2010, he was an assistant in the National Council of Slovakia and a member of several parliamentary commissions. He became the first vice-president of the Slovak National Party in 2010.

In 2012, he became the chairman of the party after getting support from many of the party's members, succeeding Ján Slota.

On 23 March 2016 Danko was elected Speaker of the National Council.

In 2016, Danko called for the Burka to be Banned in Slovakia.

Controversies

Promotion to the rank of Captain in Reserve
In September 2016, while in his position as the Speaker of the Parliament, Danko was promoted by eight ranks (from OR-4 to O-2), to Captain in Reserve of the Slovak Army, by his friend Peter Gajdoš, the Minister of Defense. The promotion was viewed by some in the media, general and internet public as a sign of corrupt government. This is because a single promotion by eight ranks has never happened in the history of Slovak Army, not at all to a person who has only joined mandatory national service for the period of one year. On April 29, 2020, Minister of Defence Jaroslav Naď canceled his rank.

Plagiarism allegations
In 2018, Danko was accused of plagiarism of his doctoral thesis at University of Matej Bel in 2000. When media showed interest in his thesis, he asked the university to ban public access to it. Following public pressure, Danko removed the ban after one month and the university library allowed the public to see the thesis, but not to take pictures of it. In November 2018 the university set up a commission to review his thesis. According to the conclusion published by the commission in January 2019, the rigorous procedure met valid regulations, but the thesis contains parts that only slightly differ from original sources, the most of the thesis is the same to a large extent and it preserves also the structure of sources without proper citation or paraphrasing.

2019 Presidential Inauguration
In 2019, Danko presided over the ceremonial assembly of the National Council of the Slovak Republic on the occasion of presidential inauguration of Zuzana Čaputová in the Slovak Philharmonic, and delivered an unscheduled speech to address the participants. This caused a breach of a protocol which states that duties of the outgoing president cease at 12.00 GMT+1 and the elect takes office. Slovak laws state that in an event of vacant presidential seat, some competences of the president are passed to the Speaker of the National Council and to the Government of the Slovak republic. Zuzana Čaputová was sworn in at 12.07, so there were some polemics concerning who was the president for the seven-minute term. Some people (including the Office of the National Council and Peter Kubina, law consultant of Zuzana Čaputová) said that the president was still Andrej Kiska, but some other people (e. g. the protocolist Ladislav Špaček) said that there was no president. Other people thought that Andrej Danko and Peter Pellegrini, the prime minister, were carrying out presidential competences.

References

1974 births
Living people
Comenius University alumni
Members of the National Council (Slovakia) 2016-2020
People from Revúca
Slovak National Party politicians
Speakers of the National Council (Slovakia)
People involved in plagiarism controversies